Ueshiba (written:  lit. "planted lawn") is a Japanese surname. Notable people with the surname include:

 Kisshomaru Ueshiba, an aikido master,  the second doshu of the Aikikai
 Morihei Ueshiba, the founder of aikido, often referred to as Ōsensei
 Moriteru Ueshiba, an aikido master,  the third doshu of the Aikikai
 Mitsuteru Ueshiba, son of Moriteru Ueshiba and presumed heir 
 Riichi Ueshiba, a Japanese manga artist

Japanese-language surnames